Advance Passenger Information System or APIS is an electronic data interchange system established by the U.S. Customs and Border Protection (CBP), 

APIS governs the provision of a limited number of data elements (identification details from the passport and basic flight information) from commercial airline and vessel operators to the computer system of the destination state.  Required information should conform to specifications for UN/EDIFACT Passenger List Message (PAXLST) formats.

Beginning in May 2009, private aircraft pilots must also provide the necessary information to the CBP. The regulations were put into effect in December 2008 with a 180-day voluntary compliance period.

 (electronic APIS) is a public website which allows small commercial carriers to transmit data to the CBP electronically.

When travelling to or from certain countries, passengers are required to provide advance passenger information (API) before they check in or they will be unable to fly. These countries include

 Antigua
 Australia
 Barbados
 Belgium
 Brazil
 Canada
 China
 Costa Rica
 Cuba
 Dominican Republic
 France
 Grenada
 India
 Ireland
 Jamaica
 Japan
 Maldives
 Mexico
 Panama
 Portugal
 Republic of Korea
 Russian Federation
 Saint Lucia
 Spain (except for Schengen Area passengers)
 Taiwan
 Trinidad & Tobago
 United Kingdom
 United States
and some more

The required information consists of:

 Full name (last name, first name, middle name if applicable)
 Gender
 Date of birth
 Nationality
 Country of residence
 Travel document type (normally passport)
 Travel document number (expiry date and country of issue for passport)
 [For travelers to the US] Address of the first night spent in the US (not required for US citizens/nationals, legal permanent residents, or alien residents of the US entering the US)

See also
Automated Targeting System
Fltplan.com
Immigration Advisory Program
Passenger name record

References

External links
 U.S. Customs and Border Protection – Travel / For Travel Industry Personnel / APIS: Advance Passenger Information System
 British Airways, Advance Passenger Information.
 eAPIS Online Transmission System (at cbp.gov)
 eAPIS UN/EDIFACT Implementation Guide (Specification – pdf)

Aviation security
National security
Identity documents of the United States